English Tapas is the ninth studio album by English post-punk duo Sleaford Mods. Recorded at Steve Mackey's West Heath Garage studios in London, it was released via Rough Trade Records on 3 March 2017. It debuted at number 12 on the UK Albums Chart.

The songs on the album are mostly about contemporary life and politics in England following the 2016 EU referendum.

Accolades

Track listing

Charts

References

External links
 

2017 albums
Sleaford Mods albums
Rough Trade Records albums